Rémy Jacques (1 January 1817 – 15 September 1905) was a French lawyer and politician. He represented the department of Oran, French Algeria, in the National Assembly and then the Chamber of Deputies from 1871 to 1882.
He was then Senator of Oran from 1882 to 1900.

Life

Rémy Jacques was born on 1 January 1817 in Breteuil, Oise.
After completing his law studies he enrolled as an advocate in Oran.

National Assembly (1871–76)

Jacques ran for election as Representative of the Oran department in the National Assembly on 17 February 1871, but won only 2,175 votes out of 10,167.
After Joseph Andrieu resigned and Léon Gambetta chose to represent another department there were two vacancies in the Assembly for Oran.
Jacques ran again on 12 July 1871 and was elected in second place by 2,288 votes out of 7,193.
This election was annulled due to irregularities in the vote counting process.

Jacques ran for election again on 7 January 1872, this time successfully.
He sat with the Republican Union group, Union républicaine. 
He voted for return of the Assembly to Paris, against the resignation of Adolphe Thiers on 24 May, against the septennat, against the state of siege, against the law of mayors, against the Ministry of Albert de Broglie, for the Wallon and Pascal Duprat amendments and for the entire Constitutional law.
He held office until 7 March 1876.

Deputy (1876–82)

Jacques was invited to run for the Senate in 1876, but chose to run for the Chamber of Deputies on 20 February 1876, and was elected to represent Oran by 5,638 votes out of 6,245.
He sat with the left, and was a member of the budget committee.
He opposed the government after the 16 May 1877 crisis, and voted with the 363 deputies against the government.
He was reelected without opposition on 14 October 1877, and joined the Opportunist Republicans majority.
He voted for invalidation of Louis Auguste Blanqui's election, for Article 7 of the Higher Education Act, for the new press laws and for the right of assembly.

On 30 June 1881 Jacques attacked the acting Governor-General of Algeria, Albert Grévy, for having caused the insurrection in Sud-Oran through his negligence.
He said "it is necessary to rid Algeria of a man who has forever lost her trust".
Jacques was reelected on 21 August 1881, holding office until 26 January 1882.
He supported the Gambetta ministry in the Chamber before leaving for the Senate.

Senator (1882–1900)

Jacques was elected Senator of Algeria on 8 January 1882.
As Senator he participated in debates over Algeria.
He voted for reform of judicial staff, for credits for the Tonkin Campaign, for divorce, for expulsion of the princes, for the new military law, for reinstatement of the district poll (13 February 1889), for the draft Lisbonne law restricting freedom of the press and for the procedure to be followed in the Senate against General Boulanger.
He was reelected on 4 January 1891 with 233 votes out of 235 due to the decisive support of Eugène Étienne.
He now devoted all his energy to defense of colonization in Algeria.

On 6 March 1891 he intervened in a discussion over antagonism between colonists and indigenous people and stated his regret that France had not brought more vinemakers to Algeria after the southern French vineyards had been ruined by phylloxera.
After this debate a committee was set up which issued a lengthy report debated on 29 May 1893.
Jacques intervened again to ask that useful proposals from the report be brought together in an organic law, which would end the administrative instability in Algeria.
On 2 September 1891 Jacques joined the senators for Algiers and Constantine in asking for credits to fight locust invasions in Algeria.
In 1894 Jacques intervened in the discussion on reforming the land ownership law in Algeria, in 1895 he called for improved postal service between metropolitan France and North Africa, in 1897 he spoke on the Algerian budget an in 1899 obtained renewal of credits for creation of schools in Algeria.
He held office until 27 January 1900.

Jacques ran for reelection in 1900 but failed.
He died on 15 September 1905 in Oran, Algeria.

Publications

Rémy Jacques published many legislative proposals and reports. A selection:

Chamber of Deputies

Senate

Notes

Sources

1817 births
1905 deaths
People from Oise
Politicians from Hauts-de-France
Republican Union (France) politicians
Members of the National Assembly (1871)
Members of the 1st Chamber of Deputies of the French Third Republic
Members of the 2nd Chamber of Deputies of the French Third Republic
Members of the 3rd Chamber of Deputies of the French Third Republic
French Senators of the Third Republic
Senators of French Algeria